The Pfitscherjoch is a mountain pass in the Zillertal Alps on the border between Tyrol, Austria, and South Tyrol, Italy.

See also
 List of highest paved roads in Europe
 List of mountain passes

References 
Austrian Alpenverein 
Alpenverein South Tyrol

External links 

Mountain passes of the Alps
Mountain passes of Tyrol (state)
Mountain passes of South Tyrol
Austria–Italy border crossings